Jerung may be,

Jerung language
Jerung-class gunboat